Verbascum bombyciferum, called the giant silver mullein, Turkish mullein and Broussa mullein, is a species of flowering plant in the genus Verbascum, native to Turkey, and introduced to California, Great Britain and Germany. It is considered a good plant to attract pollinators. With Verbascum chaixii it is a parent of the 'Pink Domino' cultivar, which has gained the Royal Horticultural Society's Award of Garden Merit.

References

bombyciferum
Endemic flora of Turkey
Plants described in 1844